Chocolate City is a central-northern suburb of Monrovia,  Liberia. It is located in the New Georgia Township. Chocolate City contains the Elizabeth Blunt School and Francis Freeman Elementary School.

During the Second Liberian Civil War in 1999–2003, the area was war torn, and "rape, murder and plunder" happened every night in Chocolate City. Hundreds of thousands of refugees hid in churches, schools and houses and many thousands died.

Chocolate City contains two communities, Chocolate City A and Chocolate City B. As of 2014 the population of Chocolate City A was estimated at 5,961 and the population of Chocolate City B at 6,025. Chocolate City A and Chocolate City B are part of the Montserrado-13 electoral district.

References

Communities of the Greater Monrovia District
History of Liberia